Events in the year 1861 in Brazil.

Incumbents
Monarch – Pedro II.
Prime Minister – Baron of Uruguaiana (until 2 March), Marquis of Caxias (starting 2 March).

Events

 June 7/8 - Shipwreck of the "Prince of Wales" in Rio Grande do Sul.

Births
 21 January - Roberto Landell de Moura

Deaths

References

 
1860s in Brazil
Years of the 19th century in Brazil
Brazil
Brazil